

The 1977 Chicago Loop derailment occurred on February 4, 1977, when a Chicago Transit Authority elevated train rear-ended another on the northeast corner of the Loop at Wabash Avenue and Lake Street during the evening rush hour. The collision forced the first four cars of the rear train off the elevated tracks, killing 11 people and injuring at least 268 as the cars fell onto the street below.

Infrastructure layout
"The Loop"  not only refers to Chicago's central business district, but also a rectangular pattern formed by the city's elevated trains. Some trains entering the Loop do a complete  circuit around the entire rectangular "loop", and after turning around all four corners, leave on the same path they came from. Other routes enter the Loop, turning only two of the corners, and then leave on a different route. Further complicating this is the fact that some trains' routes follow a clockwise pattern around the Loop, but others go counter-clockwise. 

In 1977, when the crash occurred, there were four lines operating on the Loop, each in a different direction. The Ravenswood Line (current Brown Line) operated counter-clockwise around the outer track, while the Evanston Express (current Purple Line) and Loop Shuttle operated clockwise opposite from the Ravenswood trains on the inner track. The Lake–Dan Ryan Line (part of the current Green Line) operated in both directions, but only using the Lake and Wabash legs of the Loop.

Earlier in the day of the accident, a switching issue forced dispatchers to reroute the Evanston Express to run counter-clockwise around the Loop instead of its normal clockwise route. This put it on the tracks normally used by the Ravenswood and westbound Lake–Dan Ryan trains. Because of congestion caused by this abnormal track sharing, the Ravenswood train would be required to stop short, waiting for the rerouted Evanston Express to clear before proceeding.  Additionally, this delay meant that the Ravenswood was still in place when the Lake–Dan Ryan train arrived on these tracks, and it too was required to stop and wait for the Ravenswood to clear the track before proceeding.

Collision 
At about 5:25 p.m., a Ravenswood train was waiting on the tracks, just past the northeast turn, waiting for the Evanston Express to clear the State/Lake platform. However, the Lake–Dan Ryan train did not stop as it approached the Ravenswood train. The Lake-Dan Ryan train proceeded against both track and cab signals and struck the back of the Ravenswood train. Passengers on the train reported the impact as nothing more than a "quiet thump."

However, after the impact motorman Stephan A. Martin continued to apply traction power. This resulted in the rear cars continuing to push forwards, pinning the front of the train against the waiting Ravenswood on the right-angle turn of the track. With the front Lake–Dan Ryan train unable to move forward, the pressure from behind caused the coupling bar between the first two cars to bend and the coupled ends of those two cars to be pushed in the air. As motor power continued to be applied, the first three cars (two Budd 2200 units and a single Pullman-Standard 2000) were pushed further upwards, until they jackknifed and fell off the tracks. The second and third cars fell all the way to the street below, while the first car fell onto a track support structure. The fourth car (another 2000 connected to the third car), pulled forward by the third, was derailed and dangled between the track edge and surface street. The last four cars remained on the track and still in Randolph/Wabash station.

Investigation and CTA response
While "traces of THC" were found in one urine sample, "the extent to which [Martin] may have been under the influence of marijuana at the time of the accident could not be determined by tests." Subsequent investigation revealed that Martin had a poor safety record, including reading while operating the train, and was responsible for an earlier derailment, and he had a tendency to talk to passengers while driving the train. It is theorized that, having made the normal station stop before the curve, Martin had caused the restrictive cab signal caused by the train ahead to be overridden. Distracted, he then left the station at under , which was slow enough not to trigger the automatic control, and then after the initial collision, panic or inertia caused him to move the Cineston controller forward resulting in the derailment.

As a result of the accident, the CTA forbade motormen to proceed past a red signal "on sight" without first getting permission from the Control Center. 2200 units 2289-2290 and 2000 units 2043-2044 were wrecked beyond repair and scrapped: all other trains involved were repaired and returned to service.

References

External links
 NTSB Railroad Accident Report

Chicago Transit Authority
Railway accidents and incidents in Illinois
Railway accidents in 1977
History of Chicago
1977 in Illinois
February 1977 events in the United States
Accidents and incidents involving Chicago Transit Authority